Julodis is a genus of beetles in the family Buprestidae.

List of Species

 Julodis aeneipes Saunders, 1869
 Julodis aequinoctialis (Olivier, 1790)
 Julodis albomaculata (Voet, 1806)
 Julodis algirica Laporte, 1835
 Julodis amoena Péringuey, 1898
 Julodis andreae (Olivier, 1790)
 Julodis angolensis Gussmann, 1995
 Julodis anthobia Obenberger, 1924
 Julodis aristidis Lucas, 1860
 Julodis armeniaca Marseul, 1865
 Julodis atkinsoni Kerremans, 1896
 Julodis audouinii Laporte & Gory, 1835
 Julodis balucha Obenberger, 1923
 Julodis bennigseni Obst, 1906
 Julodis bleusei Abeille de Perrin, 1896
 Julodis brevicollis Laporte & Gory, 1835
 Julodis caffer Laporte, 1835
 Julodis caillaudi (Latreille, 1823)
 Julodis candida Holynski, 1997
 Julodis chevrolatii Laporte, 1835
 Julodis chrysesthes Chevrolat, 1860
 Julodis cirrosa (Schönherr, 1817)
 Julodis clouei Buquet, 1843
 Julodis confusa Gussmann, 1995
 Julodis consobrina Kerremans, 1914
 Julodis cylindrica Théry, 1925
 Julodis dejagerae Gussmann, 1995
 Julodis desertica Ferreira & da Veiga-Ferreira, 1958
 Julodis egho Gory, 1840
 Julodis ehrenbergii Laporte, 1835
 Julodis escalerae Abeille de Perrin, 1904
 Julodis euphratica Laporte & Gory, 1835
 Julodis faldermanni Mannerheim, 1837
 Julodis fascicularis (Linnaeus, 1758)
 Julodis fidelissima Rosenhauer, 1856
 Julodis fimbriata (Klug, 1829)
 Julodis gariepina Péringuey, 1885
 Julodis hirsuta (Herbst, 1786)
 Julodis hoehnelii Fairmaire, 1891
 Julodis humeralis Gory, 1840
 Julodis interpunctata Thomson, 1878
 Julodis intricata Redtenbacher, 1843
 Julodis iris Laporte & Gory, 1835
 Julodis kabakovi Alexeev in Alexeev, et al., 1990
 Julodis kerimi Fairmaire, 1875
 Julodis klapperichi Cobos, 1966
 Julodis laevicostata Gory, 1840
 Julodis longicollis Abeille de Perrin, 1904
 Julodis lucasi Saunders, 1871
 Julodis manipularis (Fabricius, 1798)
 Julodis marmorea Kerremans, 1914
 Julodis marmottani Escalera, 1918
 Julodis matthiesseni Reitter, 1905
 Julodis mitifica Boheman, 1860
 Julodis namibiensis Gussmann, 1995
 Julodis nemethi Théry, 1932
 Julodis onopordi (Fabricius, 1787)
 Julodis oweni Gussmann, 1995
 Julodis partha Obenberger, 1923
 Julodis peregrina Chevrolat, 1838
 Julodis pietzchmanni Kerremans, 1914
 Julodis pilosa (Fabricius, 1798)
 Julodis proxima Gory, 1840
 Julodis pubescens (Olivier, 1790)
 Julodis punctatocostata Gory, 1840
 Julodis recenta Gussmann, 1995
 Julodis rothii Sturm, 1843
 Julodis speculifer Laporte, 1835
 Julodis subbrevicollis Théry, 1936
 Julodis sulcicollis Laporte & Gory, 1835
 Julodis syriaca (Olivier, 1790)
 Julodis turbulenta Gussmann, 1995
 Julodis vansoni Obenberger, 1936
 Julodis variolaris (Pallas, 1773)
 Julodis viridipes Laporte, 1835
 Julodis whitehillii (Gray, 1832)
 Julodis zablodskii Motschulsky, 1845

References

Buprestidae genera
Taxa named by Johann Friedrich von Eschscholtz